Wang Tsing-fong (born 1 January 1952 in Tainan City) is a Taiwanese lawyer and politician.

Early life
Wang graduated from the Taipei First Girls' High School and received her bachelor's and master's degrees in law from National Chengchi University.

Early career
Wang has been working as a lawyer since graduation. Since 1987, she has been organising activities to give legal support to help Taiwanese comfort women, child prostitutes, and rape victims.

Political career
She was nominated as a member of the Control Yuan by President Lee Teng-hui, serving in this position from April 1993 to October 1995.

In October 1995, Wang resigned her Control Yuan position and accepted the invitation from Chen Li-an to be his partner in their 1996 ROC Presidential Election campaign. They finished last among the four candidates, winning 9.98% of the vote.

In 2004, as an independent, Wang served as a member in the highly controversial 3-19 Shooting Investigation Committee organised by the pan-blue coalition after its loss in the 2004 ROC Presidential election. In 2005 Wang secured a seat in the National Assembly of the Republic of China after the  led by Chang Ya-chung, her recommending party, won 1.68% vote in the 2005 Republic of China National Assembly election and thereby secured five seats. Wang resigned her seat immediately upon taking office.

ROC Justice Ministry
Wang was nominated by President Ma Ying-jeou to be Minister of Justice after he won the 2008 ROC Presidential Election. On 10 March 2010, Wang announced that she is in favour of the eventual abolition of the death penalty; she emphasised that she would not allow any executions during her tenure. Her speech aroused public protests led by relatives of murder victims, such as the entertainer Pai Bing-bing (whose daughter was kidnapped and murdered in 1997). There were calls for her to step down. Wang quit her ministerial position the next day.

References

External links

Living people
1952 births
Taiwanese human rights activists
Taiwanese people of Hoklo descent
Politicians of the Republic of China on Taiwan from Tainan
Taiwanese Ministers of Justice
National Chengchi University alumni
Female justice ministers
Women government ministers of Taiwan
Government ministers of Taiwan
Taiwanese Members of the Control Yuan
20th-century Taiwanese politicians
21st-century Taiwanese politicians
21st-century Taiwanese women politicians
20th-century Taiwanese women politicians
Taiwanese women activists